Annina Ruppel (born 8 October 1980 in Herne, North Rhine-Westphalia) is a German rowing coxswain who competed in the women's eight events at the 2004 Summer Olympics and 2008 Summer Olympics. She was also a part of the women's eight winning team at the 2003 World Rowing Championships.

References

External links

1980 births
Living people
German female rowers
Coxswains (rowing)
Olympic rowers of Germany
Rowers at the 2004 Summer Olympics
Rowers at the 2008 Summer Olympics
Rowers from Sydney
World Rowing Championships medalists for Germany
People from Herne, North Rhine-Westphalia
Sportspeople from Arnsberg (region)
European Rowing Championships medalists